Aithorape flammicornis is a moth of the Megalopygidae family. It was described by Schaus in 1905. It is found in Brazil, Trinidad, Guyana, French Guiana and Venezuela.

The wingspan is about 27 mm. The body is white and the tarsi, mid- and fore tibiae are black and there is a dark spot on the fore coxae. The frons is dark brown and grey and the antennae are red. The wings are white, with the costa of the forewings finely black.

References

Moths described in 1905
Megalopygidae